Reino Soijärvi (born October 30, 1975) is a Finnish former ice hockey forward.

Soijärvi played in the Finnish lower leagues for Warkis, SaPKo and IPK before joining KooKoo of Mestis in 2000. He would play the next six seasons with KooKoo, playing 277 games and scoring 91 goals and 79 assists before retiring in 2006.

References

External links

1975 births
Living people
Finnish ice hockey forwards
Iisalmen Peli-Karhut players
KooKoo players
People from Leppävirta
SaPKo players
Sportspeople from North Savo